Odd means unpaired, occasional, strange or unusual, or a person who is viewed as eccentric.

Odd may also refer to:

Acronym
 ODD (Text Encoding Initiative) ("One Document Does it all"), an abstracted literate-programming format for describing XML schemas
 Oodnadatta Airport (IATA: ODD), South Australia
 Oppositional defiant disorder, a mental disorder characterized by anger-guided, hostile behavior
 Operational due diligence
 Operational Design Domain (ODD) in case of autonomous cars
 Optical disc drive
 ODD, a 2007 play by Hal Corley about a teenager with oppositional defiant disorder

Mathematics
 Even and odd numbers, an integer is odd if dividing by two does not yield an integer
 Even and odd functions, a function is odd if f(−x) = −f(x) for all x
 Even and odd permutations, a permutation of a finite set is odd if it is composed of an odd number of transpositions

Ships
 HNoMS Odd, a Storm-class patrol boat of the Royal Norwegian Navy
 , a Norwegian whaler

Other
 Odd (name), a male name common in Norway
 Odd (Shinee album), an album by the South Korean boy band Shinee 
 Odd, West Virginia, U.S., an unincorporated community
 Odd Della Robbia, a character in the animated television series Code Lyoko
 Odd Fellowship, a fraternal order
 Odd Grenland, a Norwegian football team
 Odd Thomas (character), a character in a series of novels by Dean Koontz
 Odd and the Frost Giants, a book by Neil Gaiman
 Odd, a science fiction short story by John Wyndham in the collection The Seeds of Time
 "Odd", a song by Loona Odd Eye Circle from Mix & Match

See also
 Odds, from probability theory and gambling
 Oddity (disambiguation)